Zayed Abbas Khan (born 5 July 1980) is a former Indian actor and producer who appeared in Hindi films. The son of Bollywood actor Sanjay Khan, he has received a Filmfare Award nomination.

After graduating in Business Management at the Montgomery College and Film Making at the London Film Academy, he made his acting debut in 2003 in Chura Liyaa Hai Tumne. His other films include Main Hoon Na (2004), Shabd (2005), Dus (2005), Yuvvraaj (2008), Blue (2009) and Anjaana Anjaani (2010).

In 2011, the actor ventured into production with his co-owned production house, Born Free Entertainment along with friend and actress Dia Mirza and her spouse Sahil Sanga with their first film, Love Breakups Zindagi. In 2017, Khan made his television debut in the show Haasil. He is married to Malaika Parekh since 2005 with whom he has two children.

Early life
Khan's parents are former Bollywood actor Shah Abbas Khan (Sanjay Khan) and interior designer Zarine Khan. His father is of mixed Afghan and Iranian descent while his mother comes from a Parsi family. Zayed, who was raised as a Muslim, is the youngest of four children and the only son of his parents. His elder sisters are Simone Khan (married to Ajay Arora), Suzanne Roshan (ex-wife of actor Hrithik Roshan), and Farah Khan Ali (married to DJ Aqeel). Khan is the nephew of late actor Feroz Khan and director Akbar Khan (brothers of Sanjay Khan) and first cousin of Bollywood actor, Fardeen Khan.

Khan attended Welham Boys' School, Dehradun, and later Kodaikanal International School, Kodaikanal, with childhood friend Esha Deol and Mallaika Parekh. He studied Business Management at the Montgomery College and Film Making at London Film Academy.

Career 

Khan made his screen debut in 2003 in the film Chura Liyaa Hai Tumne.

In 2004, he starred in Main Hoon Na, which was one of the biggest hits in his career. It was the second highest-grossing film of 2004 behind Veer-Zaara and was declared a hit. Khan was subsequently nominated for the Filmfare Award for Best Supporting Actor in 2005. He also starred alongside Amrita Arora in a music video called Disco 82 Remix by DJ Aqeel for UMI-10.

Khan had 4 releases in 2005. He played an obsessive lover in Vaada alongside Arjun Rampal and Ameesha Patel. He then starred in Shabd as a photography professor, which he was very excited about because he had always wanted to do a film with Aishwarya Rai. His third release, Anubhav Sinha's action thriller Dus, where he played a cop, did well. It was Big Hit and was the third highest-grossing film of 2005. Khan's final release of the year, Shaadi No. 1, flopped at the box office.

He starred in Sohail Khan's action multi-starrer, Fight Club - Members Only in 2006. Next, he appeared in Rocky: The Rebel. Khan revealed that he had ghost-written some scenes in the film. He had first begun script-writing when he was studying in London.

Both of his films in 2007 were action multi-starrers. Anubhav Sinha's Cash was originally meant to be the sequel to Dus, but ended up differently. Due to this, some of the cast of Dus also star in Cash. It performed reasonably well in its first week, but was unable to replicate the success of Dus and was eventually declared a flop. His next film, Speed, also failed at the box office.

In 2008, Khan had the leading role as a news reporter in Apoorva Lakhia's Mission Istaanbul opposite Vivek Oberoi. He also starred in the Bollywood remake of Rain Man, Yuvvraaj with Salman Khan, Katrina Kaif and Anil Kapoor.

The following year, he featured in the underwater action thriller Blue. At the time of its release, the film broke the record for having the highest budget for a Bollywood film. It had an excellent opening weekend on Diwali, collecting 480 million, but was a below-average grosser. He also filmed Sharafat Gayi Tel Lene, a comedy thriller film. However, it ran into production hassles and was released in 2015.

Khan had a special appearance as an unfaithful fiancé in the 2010 Ranbir Kapoor–Priyanka Chopra starrer, Anjaana Anjaani.

In 2011, the actor ventured into production with his co-owned production house, Born Free Entertainment along with friend and actress Dia Mirza and her husband, Sahil Sanga. Their first film, Love Breakups Zindagi, was released on 7 October 2011, and was met with a lukewarm response.

In 2012, Khan played a supporting role in Tezz, which stars Anil Kapoor and Ajay Devgan in the lead.

In August 2017, Khan made his television debut on a show called Haasil playing the role of Ranvir Raichand opposite Vatsal Sheth and Nikita Dutta. The show premiered in October 2017.

Personal life

Khan married his high school sweetheart Malaika Parekh on 20 November 2005. In an interview, Malaika stated that Zayed proposed four times to her and she has four rings from him. They are of exactly the same age and they both studied in Kodaikanal International School. They first became acquainted with each other in 1995.

The couple have two sons, born in 2008 and 2011. In 2008, Khan gave up smoking upon the birth of his first son, in order to ensure that his children grew up without accepting any bad habits as normal.

Awards and nominations

Filmography

Films

Television

References

External links 
 

Living people
Kodaikanal International School alumni
Indian male film actors
Indian male television actors
Indian Shia Muslims
Male actors in Hindi cinema
Indian people of Pashtun descent
Indian people of Afghan descent
Indian people of Iranian descent
Parsi people
Parsi people from Mumbai
1980 births